Leghlan (also Romanized as Leghlān; also known as Leqalān and Lihlan) is a village in Dodangeh Rural District, Hurand District, Ahar County, East Azerbaijan Province, Iran. At the 2006 census, its population was 279, in 63 families.

References 

Tageo

Populated places in Ahar County